Middle River is an estuary in Baltimore County, Maryland, located about 5 miles (8 km) east of the city of Baltimore.  The estuary extends from the community of Middle River, north of the Martin Plaza Shopping Center, to the southeast for about 4 miles (6.4 km), to the Chesapeake Bay.  The watershed area of Middle River is 12 square miles (31 km2), and includes Martin State Airport.

Tributaries of Middle River
Clockwise from the southern edge of its mouth, they are:
 Sue Creek
 Hogpen Creek
 Norman Creek
 Hopkins Creek
 Upper Middle River (no separate name)
 Dark Head Creek; its nontidal portion is Cowpens Run; Martins Lagoon is the upper tidal portion near Martin State Airport (neither of the latter two names are official feature names in GNIS)
 Stansbury Creek
 Frog Mortar Creek
 Galloway Creek

See also
List of Maryland rivers

References
 Baltimore County Department of Environmental Protection and Resource Management (DEPRM). Towson, MD. "Middle River Watershed."  Accessed 2009-07-31.
 DEPRM. "Water Quality Management Plan for Middle River Watershed." Executive Summary. March 2001.  Includes a watershed map on page 3.
 United States Geological Survey. Reston, VA. "Middle River." Geographic Names Information System (GNIS). Accessed 2009-07-31.

Rivers of Baltimore County, Maryland
Tributaries of the Chesapeake Bay
Rivers of Maryland